Carl Milton Smith (March 15, 1927 – January 16, 2010) was an American country singer. Known as "Mister Country", he was one of the genre's most successful male artists during the 1950s, scoring 30 top-10 Billboard hits (21 of which were consecutive). Smith's success continued well into the 1970s, when he had a charting single every year but one. In 1952, Smith married June Carter, with whom he had daughter Carlene, the couple divorced in 1956. His eldest daughter Carlene was also the stepdaughter of fellow late country singer Johnny Cash, who was subsequently married to his ex-wife Carter. He later married Goldie Hill, and they had three children together. In 2003, he was inducted into the Country Music Hall of Fame. According to the Hollywood Walk of Fame website, he was a "drinking companion" to Johnny Cash, his daughter's stepfather.

Biography

Early career 
Smith was born in Maynardville, Tennessee, in 1927 (the same town in which fellow country icon Roy Acuff had been born), and started to aspire to a musical career after hearing the Grand Ole Opry on the radio.  He sold seed to pay for guitar lessons as a teenager. At age 15, he started performing in a band called Kitty Dibble and Her Dude Ranch Ranglers. By age 17, he had learned to play the string bass and spent his summer vacation working at WROL-AM in Knoxville, Tennessee, where he performed on Cas Walker's radio show.

After graduating from high school, he served in the U.S. Navy from 1944–47. He returned to WROL and played string bass for country singers Molly O'Day and Skeets Williamson, and began his singing career. A colleague at the station sent an acetate disc recording of Smith to WSM-AM and the Grand Ole Opry in Nashville, Tennessee, and WSM soon signed him. In 1950, Smith was signed to a recording contract with Columbia Records by producer Don Law.

Success in the 1950s 
In 1951, his song "Let's Live a Little" was a big hit, reaching number two on the Billboard country chart. During 1951, he had three other hits, including "If the Teardrops Were Pennies" and his first number-one hit, "Let Old Mother Nature Have Her Way". The songs made Smith a well-known name in country music. His band, the Tunesmiths, featured steel guitarist Johnny Silbert, who added an element of Western swing.

In 1952, Smith married June Carter, daughter of Maybelle Carter of the Carter Family. It was the first marriage for both. In 1955, the couple had a daughter, Rebecca Carlene Smith, who later became known as Carlene Carter, a country singer in her own right. The couple recorded the duets, "Time's a Wastin'" and "Love Oh Crazy Love". During the rest of the 1950s, Smith made regular appearances on Billboard's country charts, racking up many hits, including 30 in the top 10. His biggest hits include "Loose Talk", "Hey Joe!", and "You Are the One". He had five number-one hits in his career; "Loose Talk" was his last, in 1955. In 1956, Smith quit the Grand Ole Opry. Soon after, he joined The Phillip Morris Country Music Show and spent more than a year touring the United States, often in direct competition with touring Opry shows. He also made regular appearances on ABC-TV's Jubilee USA and was a fill-in host for Red Foley.

In 1956, Smith and June Carter divorced. In 1957, he appeared in the movies The Badge of Marshal Brennan and Buffalo Gun, and married country music singer Goldie Hill, best known for the number-one hit "I Let the Stars Get In My Eyes". Goldie retired from the music business. By the late 1950s, Smith's success began to dwindle on the country charts, and soon his string of top-10 hits began to dwindle.

Later years 
By the 1960s, Smith's success as a country singer began to slow. His top-20 hits included "Air Mail To Heaven" in 1962 and "Take My Ring Off Your Finger" in 1964. His biggest hit of the decade was "Deep Water" in 1967, which peaked at number 10 and became his first top 10 in eight years (and his final top-10 appearance). In 1961, he was one of five rotating hosts on the NBC television series Five Star Jubilee. He also hosted Carl Smith's Country Music Hall in Canada, a series syndicated in the United States. Smith appeared on The Jimmy Dean Show on April 9, 1964.

In the 1960s and 1970s, Smith incorporated more Western swing into much of his recorded material. He remained with Columbia Records for almost 25 years, leaving in 1975 to sign with Hickory Records. By this time, his singles were barely making the charts. He appeared in the Hawaii Five-O episode, "Man on Fire", first aired on October 21, 1976.

Due to his real estate and song publishing investments, he decided to retire from the music business in the late 1970s to concentrate on his second passion, raising cutting horses, but in 1983, he recorded an album for the Gusto label. In 2003, he was inducted into the Country Music Hall of Fame.

Death 
In his later years, Smith lived on a  horse farm in Franklin, Tennessee (south of Nashville), where he died on January 16, 2010, at the age of 82. His wife Goldie had died five years prior. He was survived by two sons, Carl Jr. and Larry Dean, and two daughters, Carlene and Lori Lynn.

Discography

Albums

Singles

Notes

References 
Pugh, Ronnie. (1998). "Carl Smith". In The Encyclopedia of Country Music. Paul Kingsbury, Editor. New York: Oxford University Press. pp. 489–90.

External links 

 Carl Smith at the Country Music Hall of Fame
 

1927 births
2010 deaths
People from Maynardville, Tennessee
American country guitarists
American male guitarists
American country singer-songwriters
Country musicians from Tennessee
Country Music Hall of Fame inductees
Members of the Country Music Association
Grand Ole Opry members
Guitarists from Tennessee
20th-century American guitarists
20th-century American male musicians
United States Navy personnel of World War II
American male singer-songwriters
Singer-songwriters from Tennessee
Cash–Carter family